Eduard Mkrtychevich Spertsyan (born 7 June 2000) is a professional football player who plays as an attacking midfielder for FC Krasnodar. Born in Russia, he represents the Armenia national team.

Club career
Spertsyan made his debut in the Russian Professional Football League for FC Krasnodar-2 on 17 March 2018 in a game against FC Biolog-Novokubansk. He made his Russian Football National League debut for Krasnodar-2 on 1 October 2018 in a game against FC Khimki.

After scoring seven goals in the first nine games of the FNL season for FC Krasnodar-2, he made his Russian Premier League debut for FC Krasnodar on 18 September 2020 in a game against FC Khimki. On 28 October 2020, he made his European debut as a late substitute in the Champions League 4–0 home loss to Chelsea.

International
On 17 February 2021, the Football Federation of Armenia confirmed that Spertsyan would join the Armenia national team in March to prepare for the World Cup qualifiers. Spertsyan made his debut for the national team on 31 March 2021 against Romania. He came on as a substitute at half-time, scoring in the 56th minute at the Republican Stadium. He scored the only goal in a match against Ireland in Yerevan for Armenia to get the win, as well as at the away game in Dublin as Ireland would go on to win 3-2 at the Aviva stadium.

Career statistics

International

Scores and results list Armenia's goal tally first, score column indicates score after each Spertsyan goal.

Honours
Individual
Armenian Footballer of the Year: 2022

References

External links
 
 
 

2000 births
Sportspeople from Stavropol
Russian people of Armenian descent
Citizens of Armenia through descent
Living people
Russian footballers
Armenian footballers
Armenia international footballers
Association football midfielders
FC Krasnodar-2 players
FC Krasnodar players
Russian Premier League players
Russian First League players
Russian Second League players